Mundi is a city and Tehsil in the Khandwa district of  Nimar region the Indian state of Madhya Pradesh. It is situated in North Side of East Nimar District.

Mundi is an ancient city, with many places of worship, like many other cities in India. Most temples have Hindu or Jain statues. The city is over a thousand years old and is surrounded by a forest in the Narmada river valley. Shri Sant Singaji and Sant Bokhardas Gulabdas Dham & Hanuwantiya Tapu are located nearby. Kherkhali river (a part of River that flows at northern edge of the City.
Presently, Mundi is a major Electric Hub City with a manufacturing unit of Sant Singaji Thermal Power Plant and Indira Sagar Dam.
The city is situated at the bank of Kherkhali(Narmada) river and is known for its cotton, Soyabean, Wheat production.

Demographics

 India census, Mundi had a population of 30,000. Males constitute 52% of the population and females 48%. Mundi has an average literacy rate of 72%, higher than the national average of 59.5%: male literacy is 70%, and female literacy is 52%. In Mundi, 15% of the population is under 6 years of age.

Workers profile

Mundi has 34% (4397) population engaged in either main or marginal works. 54% male and 13% female population are working population. 49% of total male population are main (full time) workers and 5% are marginal (part time) workers. For women 9% of total female population are main and 4% are marginal workers.

Location
It has an average elevation of 300 metres (1000 feet).

Fame

Mundi is known for its ancient time of Mahabharat Hindu Temples as Koteshwer & Loteshwer Mahadev & also for Maa Renuka Dham. The famous tourist places of Mundi  are Singaji, St. Bokhardas Gulabdas Dham, Hanumantiya Island, a new place for adventurous water sports in the back waters of Indira Sagar Dam.

History
The name of the city is derived from "Mundari" (meaning ring or circle shape). During the rise of Buddhism, the East Nimar region was included in the Avanti Kingdom under Chand Pradyota Mahesana, which was later added to the growing empire of Magadha by Shishunaga. From the early 2nd century BC to the late 15th century AD, the Nimar Region (earlier a part of Khandesh) was ruled by many emperors from many dynasties, which include Mauryas, Shungas, Satvahanas, Kardamakas, Abhiras, Vakatakas, Imperial Guptas, Kalchuris, Vardhanas (of Harsha Vardhana fame), Chalukyas, Patels ( shatriya Gurjars  ), Kanungos, Rashtrakutas, Paramaras, Faruki,etc. A well is situated at ‘’’Koteshwer’’’ or ‘’’Loteshwer’’’, created by Pandhawas. In the 12th century, the throne was moved from Mundi to Bhamgarh. Raja Rao Kishore Singh ji used to be the ruler of Bhamgarh during this period. In the 13th century, Rajput Rajvansi used to be the rule of Rao Kishore Singh ji.In the 15th century, Rao Lakhme Singh used to rule, in which there were 362 villages, the main places used to be Mundi, Harsud, Bhamgarh, Rangaon, Kolgaon etc. And under his rule, Sant Singaji Maharaj used to work. After this, the successor of the state, Rao Bhim Singh ji became the king, because he did not have any son, he had given all the property to the daughters.‘’’Renuka Dham’’’ is another ancient temple. Since the mid-16th century to the early 18th century, the Nimar region, was under the rule of Aurangzeb, Bahadur Shah, Peshwas, Sindhia, Bawaniya, Holkar, Pawar, (Marathas), Pindaris etc. Later from early part of the mid-18th century, the management of the Nimar region came under the British.

Gurjar Empire
According to history, Bhinmal was the capital of the Gurjar Empire in the 5th century and was founded by the Gurjars. The kingdom of Bharuch was also under the Gujjars. The Chinese traveler Hiuen Tsang mentions the Gurjar Empire in his writings and calls it 'kiu-che-lo'. [13] The Gurjars were in power in many places from the 6th to the 12th century. The power of the Gurjara Pratihara dynasty extended from Kannauj to Bihar , Uttar Pradesh , Maharashtra and Gujarat . Mihirbhoj is considered to be the great ruler of the Gurjara-Pratihara dynasty and his battles were fought between the Pala dynasty of Bengal and South-India.Rashtrakuta rulers used to live. The Pratihara dynasty began to decline before the 12th century and was divided into several dynasties such as the Chauhan dynasty , the Solanki dynasty , the Chandila and the Parmar dynasty . [14] [15] The Arab invaders have fully praised the power and administration of the Gurjars in their inscriptions. [16] [17] Historians state that before the Mughal period, almost the whole of Rajasthan and Gujarat was known as 'Gurjatra' (country protected from Gurjaras) or Gurjara-bhoomi. [18] ArabAccording to the writers, the Gurjars were their worst enemies. He has also said that if there were no Gujjars, they would have occupied India before the 12th century. [16] Even in the 18th century, the Gujjars had some small kingdoms. There were 133 villages under Dargahi Singh, the Gurjar king of Dadri. The king of Meerut was Gurjar Nain Singh and he got the Parikshit Garh rebuilt. According to the India Gazetteer, the Gurjars proved to be very bad enemies of the British in the first Indian freedom struggle of 1857 . Gujjars have also played an important role in the revolt of 1857 . Kotwal Dhan Singh Gurjar was a martyr of the 1857 revolt . [19] [18] A heroine like Panna Dhai was born, who sacrificed her son Chandan.Save Uday Singh 's life. Bishaldev Gurjar became a king like Baisala ( founder of Ajmer city) who probably ruled Ajmer in the 8th century as well as successfully resisted Arab incursions and helped the Gurjars of the Tomar dynasty gain control of Delhi, [20 There were kings like the Nag dynasty Kshatriya Gurjars of Devnarayan Chauhan dynasty , whose original place was presently Nag Pahar near Ajmer . [21] , Vijay Singh Pathik As there were revolutionary leaders who used to loot the farmers, they strengthened the farmers by running a movement against them. There were mighty men like Motiram Baisala who stopped the Mughals in Agra itself. Dhan Singh ji became the Kotwal, who was the first to fight the British in Meerut, a great man like Sardar Vallabhbhai Patel was born, who built the Navbharat by uniting the legacy of the king-maharajas of the whole country. In order to protect this country, this brave Gurjar caste had sacrificed millions of children, the Gujjars who cracked the nose of the British were called by the British as Criminal Tribe (ie crook community). That is why at that time the British government had declared the Gujjars as rebels, for this reason the Gujjars started living in the forests and mountains and for this reason the Gurjars were deprived of education.

Gallery

Business and lifestyle
Surrounded by around 40 villages, business is mainly dependent on Agriculture. Most grown crops include Soybean, Cotton, Wheat. It is known as the Business City of Khandwa district. Festivals like Diwali, Dussehra, Raksha Bandhan, Eid, Holi, Guru Saptami, Gangor are celebrated with joy and excitement.

Saint Singaji Thermal Power Plant
Shree Singaji Thermal Power Project Phase I is a 2 x 600 megawatt (MW) coal-fired power station. It is near Dongalia village Near by mundi in the district of Khandwa, Madhya Pradesh, India.

Shivriya Township
It is a colony for people who work in the thermal power plant MPPGCL staff living in colony.
Most of the officers on important posts in Singaji Thermal Power Plant reside in Shivariya Township.

Industry
The Mundi area has a developing industrial sector because of the Saint Singaji Thermal Power Plant and the Indira Sagar Pariyojna. There are small and medium scale industries such as diary, poetry firm, cloth industry etc. and presently large scale industry are also in developing stage. Some industries established in an area which as Kaka Industries, Shree Vallabh Oil Mill, Bulandi Brick Industry,Ashutosh Cotton Mill.

Tourism
Famous tourism spots are:
* Sant Singaji Dham
 Hanuvantiya Water Sport Complex
 Sant Bokhardas Saint Gulabdas Baba Mandir 
 Maa Renuka Dham 
 Mata Mandir Mundi 
 Koteshwer /Loteshwer Mandir

Religious places 
 Sant Singaji Dham
 Sant Bokhardas Saint Gulabdas Baba Mandir 
 Maa Renuka Dham 
 Mata Mandir Mundi 
 Koteshwer /Loteshwer Mandir
 Shri Ram Mandir
 Maa Sheetala Mandir
 Maa Ganga Mandir
 Maa Narmada Mandir
 Vishnu Mandir
 Shivpuri Mahadev Mandir
 Hanuman Mandir
 Sai Mandir Mundi

Government offices
Lal Bhahdur Shastri Bus Stand
Mundi Bus Stand
Tehsil Office
Rajshay Vibhag
MPEB Office
Police Station
Post Office
B.S.N.L Office
Nagar Pallika

Nagar Parishad

Mundi Nagar Parishad, with a population of about 30 thousand is Khandwa district's most populous Nagar Parishad located in the district of Khandwa (East Nimar) district in the state of Madhya Pradesh in India. The total geographical area of Mundi Nagar Parishad is 18 km2 and it is the 2nd biggest city by area in the district. The population density of the city is 735 persons per km2. There are 15 wards in the city, among them Mundi Ward No 01 is the most populous ward with a population of 1663, and Mundi Ward No 11 is the least populous ward with a population of 443. A total of 1826 families reside in the city council area.

District head quarter of the city is Khandwa which is 33  km away. Bhopal is the state head quarter of the city and is 225  km far from here. The yearly average rainfall of the city is 668.2  mm. The maximum temperature here reaches up to 48 °C and the minimum temperature goes down to 1 °C.

MLAs 
Narayan Patel Gurjar (2018-2020) BJP
Lokendrasingh Tonar BJP (2008-2013 व 2013-2018)
Thakur Rajnarayan Singh Purni (1998-2008) INC
Raghurajsingh Tomar (1990-1993 व 1993-1998) BJP
Thakur Rajnarayan Singh Purni (1985-1990) INC
Raghurajsingh Tomar (1977-1980, 1980-1985) BJP
Raghunath Mandloi (1972-1977) BJP
Radhakishan Bhagat (1967-1972) (Nirdali)

Mundi Tehsil Banao Samiti

The demand for making Mundi a tehsil was a multi-purpose demand of the area. For which the work of connecting people on social networking sites was done by the youth of the city in 2015. Connecting with this campaign by NP, a meeting was organized in Rathore Dharamshala. In which both the parties Congress and BJP joined and the rural people of the area also participated.It was decided by the committee that the proposal letter of the villages joining the tehsil would be collected and sent to the government and the demand would be fulfilled. Santosh Rathore, Uttampal Singh Purani, Narayan Patel, Nitin Bhagat, Lokesh Rathore, Shreyansh Jain, Dharmendra Rathore, Amit Khanuja, Rajnarayan Mandloi, Gaurav Mahajan, Nikhil Solanki, etc., were completed by the members in collecting the proposal letter.In the 2018 assembly elections, this demand was placed by the state government by Narayan Patel from the Congress. In 2020, MLA Narayan Patel resigned after the demand was not fulfilled and this demand was again placed in front of the government after contesting from the BJP. On September 24, 2021, the order letter of Mundi tehsil was issued by the Chief Minister of the state and on September 28, 2021, the committee and the people of the city were conveyed.

Education
The district is served well by several educational institutes, comprising both the private and public sectors. There is a government post-graduate degree college in the city.along with several English and Hindi medium schools and colleges. These institutions offer degrees in both the science and the arts. This district is the best educational district in the Nimar region. Ranks of districts: 1) Khargone, 2) Khandwa, and 3) Barwani.

Colleges 
I.T.I College 
Lions College 
Government Degree College

Schools 
St. Mary's Convent High School
Govt.Boy's Higher Sec. School
Govt. Girl's Hr.Sec.School
Janpad Hr.Sec.School
Lions Hr.Sec.School
Aasha Devi Public School
Saraswati Vidya Mandir
Model Public School
Sanskar Public School
Saraswati Shishu Vidya Mandir
Rewottama international school.

Health
Government Hospital
Gupta Nurshing Home
Charak Hospital

Banks
 Bank of India
 Narmada Jhabua Gramin Bank
 Nimar Sahkari Gramin Bank
 Dena Bank
 State Bank Of India
 Union Bank Of India

Transport
Mundi is connected to SH-41 (Khandwa-Mundi-Ashta State Highway), SH-41A (Omkareshwer-Nagar-Punasa State Highway) and to Indore, Khandwa, Bhopal, Burhanpur, Nagpur, Barwaha etc. Indian Railways started Khandwa-Bir passenger to connect Khandwa railway junction to Mundi.
More than 200 buses operate and provide road connectivity to major cities of the State. The local transport system which includes mini buses, tempos to provide connectivity to more than 40 nearby villages.

References

External links

Cities and towns in Khandwa district
Khandwa